Gomphomacromiidae is a family of dragonflies
occurring in Chile and Australia, 
which until recently was considered to be part of the Corduliidae family.

Genera
The family includes the following genera:
 Archaeophya

Notes
The family Gomphomacromiidae is not currently recognised in the World Odonata List at the Slater Museum of Natural History.

References

 
Libelluloidea
Odonata families
Odonata of Australia
Taxa named by Robert John Tillyard
Taxa named by Frederic Charles Fraser
Insects described in 1940